What Did Jack Do? is a 2017 American black-and-white short film written and directed by David Lynch. It premiered on November 8, 2017, at the Fondation Cartier pour l'Art Contemporain in Paris. It was later released to Netflix on January 20, 2020. In the film, a detective (played by Lynch) interrogates a capuchin monkey who possibly committed a murder.

Plot
The film's synopsis reads "In a locked down train station, a homicide detective conducts an interview with a tormented monkey."

Cast
 "Jack Cruz" as the monkey (credited as "Himself")
 David Lynch as Detective
 "Toototabon" as herself, a chicken
 Emily Stofle as Waitress

Production
Lynch first mentioned the project in December 2014, in an interview about his upcoming work recorded during his "Naming" exhibition at the Middlesbrough Institute of Modern Art: "Right now I'm mostly writing [Twin Peaks], I've got a painting going and I'm building a chair. I love to build things and this is for a monkey film. I'm working with a monkey named Jack and that'll come out sometime. It is not a chimpanzee, the monkey came from South America."

The film was eventually shot in 2016, and premiered on November 8, 2017 at the Fondation Cartier pour l'Art Contemporain in Paris, as part of the launch of Lynch's Nudes photo book published by the Fondation. Lynch had talked about the premiere during an interview with the Cahiers du cinéma recorded on October 30, 2017, and published in December: "I will be in Paris for the release of this book. I will sign copies at the Paris Photo fair. And then I will show my "monkey film" at the Fondation Cartier. It's a strange film of 17 minutes". On May 20, 2018, the short had its U.S. premiere during Lynch's "Festival of Disruption" in New York. On January 20, 2020, the date of Lynch's 74th birthday, the short was made available for streaming to Netflix.

Reception
In his write-up of the film, Bloody Disgusting's John Squires called What Did Jack Do? an "oddball gem". Writing for IndieWire Tambay Obensen referred to the film as "bizarre and unsettling" while at the same time calling it "very funny" whether that was the director's intention or not. On review aggregator Rotten Tomatoes, the film has an approval rating of 93% based on 14 reviews, with an average score of 7.8/10.

References

External links

2017 films
American black-and-white films
Short films directed by David Lynch
Netflix specials
2010s English-language films